S. inornatus may refer to:
 Samariscus inornatus, a flounder species in the genus Samariscus
 Scelotes inornatus, a skink species in the genus Scelotes

See also
 Inornatus